Robert Lee Trice (August 28, 1926 – September 16, 1988) was an American baseball pitcher who played for the Philadelphia / Kansas City Athletics (1953–1955).

Career
Trice's professional career began with the Negro league Homestead Grays, where he played from 1948 to 1950. He was brought to Philadelphia in 1953 after winning 21 games for the Ottawa A's of the International League.  When Trice made his major league debut (September 13, 1953 at Connie Mack Stadium), he became the first black player in Athletics history.  He appeared in three games for the A's that season, winning 2 and losing 1.  He lost his first start, 5-2, to Don Larsen and the St. Louis Browns, but then defeated the Washington Senators in each of his other two starts.

His finest major league effort came on April 24, 1954 against the New York Yankees. He pitched a 1-0 complete game shutout that day in front of a home crowd of 4,920.

Career totals for 27 games played (26 as a pitcher) include a 9–9 record, 21 games started, 9 complete games, 1 shutout, and 3 games finished. He allowed 98 earned runs in 152 innings pitched, giving him a lifetime ERA of 5.80. He had a strong bat for a pitcher...at the plate he was 15-for-52 (.288) with 1 home run, 6 runs batted in, 8 runs scored, and a slugging percentage of .423.

Trice died at the age of 62 in Weirton, West Virginia.

See also
List of first black Major League Baseball players
 List of Negro league baseball players who played in Major League Baseball

References

External links
 and Baseball-Reference Black Baseball stats and Seamheads
Retrosheet
Baseball Library
Venezuelan Professional Baseball League statistics

 

1926 births
1988 deaths
African-American baseball players
American expatriate baseball players in Canada
American expatriate baseball players in Mexico
Baseball players from Georgia (U.S. state)
Columbus Jets players
Diablos Rojos del México players
Farnham Pirates players
Homestead Grays players
Kansas City Athletics players
Leones del Caracas players
American expatriate baseball players in Venezuela
Major League Baseball pitchers
Mexican League baseball pitchers
Ottawa A's players
People from Baker County, Georgia
Philadelphia Athletics players
St. Hyacinthe A's players
Savannah A's players
20th-century African-American sportspeople